The longfin darter (Etheostoma longimanum) is a species of freshwater ray-finned fish, a darter from the subfamily Etheostomatinae, part of the family Percidae, which also contains the perches, ruffes and pikeperches. It is endemic to the eastern United States, where it occurs in the upper James River drainage in Virginia and West Virginia. It inhabits rocky riffles of creeks and small rivers.

References

Etheostoma
Fish described in 1888